The 5th APAN Star Awards ceremony was held on October 2, 2016 at MBC Sangam Culture Plaza, Sangam-dong, Seoul. Shin Dong-yup and Honey Lee were the host of the award ceremony. First held in 2012, the annual awards ceremony recognizes the excellence in South Korea's television. The nominees were chosen from 63 Korean dramas that aired on broadcasting networks MBC, KBS and SBS and cable channels tvN, jtbc, OCN, MBN and TV Chosun from September 1, 2015 to September 30, 2016.

The highest honor of the ceremony, Grand Prize (Daesang), was awarded to the actor Song Joong-ki of the drama series Descendants of the Sun.

Nominations and winners

Winners are listed first, highlighted in boldface, and indicated with a dagger.

References

External links
 

APAN
APAN Star Awards
APAN Star Awards